Liechtensteiner nationality law details the conditions by which an individual is a national of Liechtenstein. The primary law governing these requirements is the Law on the Acquisition and Loss of Citizenship, which came into force on 4 January 1934.

Liechtenstein is a member state of the European Free Trade Association (EFTA). All Liechtensteiner nationals have automatic and permanent permission to live and work in any European Union (EU) or EFTA country.

Any person born to at least one Liechtensteiner parent receives citizenship at birth, regardless of the place of birth. Foreign nationals may naturalise after living in the country for at least 10 years, renouncing any previous nationalities, becoming accepted as local citizens of a municipality by popular vote, and demonstrating proficiency in the German language.

History 

Until the early 19th century, German lands constituted the core part of the highly decentralised Holy Roman Empire. Each of the roughly 1,800 individual political entities within the Empire had varying (or non-existent) definitions on who they considered to be members of their polity. "Citizenship" in this context was tied to a person's settlement in a particular municipality and individuals found outside of their ordinary places of residence could be deported to other parts of imperial territory.

Admission into and departure from the principality was strictly controled; any person wishing to enter Liechtenstein was required to purchase their acceptance into the league of feudal bondsman who owed allegiance to the local lord. Rural communities in Liechtenstein additionally restricted the number of new citizens with entrance fees that were required for individuals to participate in local village cooperatives. A women who married outside of her village automatically lost her previous cooperative rights and her husband was required to pay for her rights in his local community. The fees to bring in a wife from another Liechtenstein municipality were much lower than for a foreign wife. Children automatically acquired the village rights of their fathers at the time of birth.

The modern concept of citizenship, as a formal and legal relationship between an individual and a state that confers privileges to holders and a status that persists beyond continued territorial residence, emerged during the French Revolution. Following the dissolution of the Holy Roman Empire in 1806, this model of citizenship was imported into the German territories that became part of the French-led Confederation of the Rhine, though any applicable legislation from this period was repealed in the 1810s shortly after French defeat in the Napoleonic Wars. Outside of this Confederation, Austria enacted its first codified regulations based on the modern citizenship concept in 1811. Due to the close ties between the Liechtenstein princes and the House of Habsburg, the country adopted the Austrian regulations in local law in 1812. Under this law, foreigners could acquire citizenship by entering the civil service, becoming employed in occupations that required residence in Liechtenstein, or residing within the principality for at least 10 years. Approval for a grant of citizenship was given at the discretion of the Prince or an appropriate court official. Children born to Liechtenstein citizen fathers automatically acquired citizenship at birth.

Legislative reforms in 1842 and 1843 formalised the concept of local citizenship (as opposed to Liechtenstein citizenship), which encompassed the cooperative rights traditionally granted by local villages and co-ownership of community assets. Local citizenship was automatically passed to children by descent or could be acquired by the purchase of a residence in a community. All other individuals could apply for admission as local citizens. Although not required by law, community administrations often demanded payment of a fee before proceeding with an application. Community assemblies (composed of every citizen eligible to vote) of the locality in which applicants intended to join subsequently deliberated on their admission. All applications were subject to final approval by the central government, which held discretionary power to veto any grant. Under the 1842/1843 revisions, new Liechtenstein citizens became required to swear an oath of allegiance to the state and submit documentary evidence detailing their birthplace, previous employment, and financial assets.

Policy alignment within the German Confederation 

As a result of the Congress of Vienna, the German Confederation was created in 1815 as a permanent replacement for the Holy Roman Empire and included virtually all of the former Empire's territory. This political structure was not a federal state and sovereign power remained with the 38 individual member states. Each state continued to hold jurisdiction over citizenship, but the vast majority of them passed no specific codified laws on the subject until the mid-19th century.

Any applicable contemporary legislation in the Confederation was inconsistent among the states and generally ineffectual at determining the citizenship of a particular person. State regulations often assumed the existence of some type of citizenship that a child would inherit from their father at the time of their birth. However, any person born in the 18th century who would have been a citizen of an area of the Holy Roman Empire that no longer existed as a political entity would have had an undefined status in state law.

Conversely, every state had concluded by the 1820s at least one treaty with some or all other members of the Confederation that detailed the deportation of undesirable persons without state citizenship and process of "implicit naturalisation". A German who resided in another state for at least 10 years was considered to have been naturalised implicitly in their new place of domicile. An implicitly naturalised father would have automatically passed his changed citizenship status to his entire family. In seven states, this process was extended to any alien who fulfilled the minimum residence requirement. These interstate treaties additionally clarified the position of persons with unclear status, who were granted the contemporary existing citizenship of their birthplace (if that was uncertain, then the place where they were found). Germans lost their state citizenship if they left state territory with the intent to reside elsewhere permanently, had obtained formal permission to emigrate, or otherwise continuously lived outside of their home state for at least 10 years.

Theoretically, the Constitution of the German Confederation created a common German nationality. Article 18 of the document detailed a set of basic rights for every German; any subject of a German state was entitled to freely purchase property in any part of the Confederation, emigrate to other states willing to admit them, enlist in another state's armed forces or civil service, and were exempt from a tax on emigration. In practice, member states did not permit Germans from other states to freely immigrate into their territories, rendering these constitutional rights generally moot. The Frankfurt Parliament expanded on this idea of a unified German nationality; any state citizen of the short-lived 1848-1849 German Empire was also a German national, and all German nationals held the same rights as citizens of any German state.

Multilateral negotiations among the states resumed after the German Confederation was reconstituted in 1849. Prussia and 20 other states agreed on the Gotha Treaty in 1851, which lowered the residence requirement for implicit naturalisation to five years and introduced a formal distinction between emigration to other German states and emigration to jurisdictions outside of the Confederation. All German states had acceded to this treaty by 1861. Following the collapse of the German Confederation in 1866 as a result of the Austro-Prussian War, Liechtenstein abolished its military and became a neutral independent state. The majority of the remaining Confederation states joined the newly formed Prussian-led North German Confederation, which later became the German Empire in 1871.

Bought citizenships 

Until 1864, it was possible for Liechtenstein citizens not to hold local citizenship. Beginning in that year, any person naturalising as a Liechtenstein citizen would be guaranteed to be accepted by a local community, provided that they could pay the entrance fees that these communities continued to charge. Liechtensteiner women who married foreign men automatically lost their Liechtenstein citizenship, and foreign women who married Liechtensteiner men became citizens. While they were previously only able to become local citizens at the discretion of the communities, they became eligible to acquire that status by right, although only with payment of an entry charge. Some local communities persisted in rejecting integrating this group and demanded exorbitant fees to block their entry, leading to intervention by the central government.

Fees were only charged for obtaining local citizenship until 1920. Legislative reform in that year allowed the state to begin charging applicants for Liechtenstein citizenship a monetary fee, which would be at least 20 per cent of the fee levied by the municipalities. Additionally, the national government could waive the requirement for renouncing previous nationalities "in cases worthy of special consideration". The fees for these "bought citizenships" were constantly increased; each applicant could expect to pay 15,000 Swiss francs for local citizenship and 7,500 for national citizenship in 1934, rising to 25,000 and 12,500 francs by 1938. Applicants for this pathway to citizenship were not required to reside in Liechtenstein nor did they need to have any family connections to the country, but also did not receive a local citizenship as part of the naturalisation process. Children born to individuals with a purchased citizenship received citizenship by descent as normal, which led to further grants of citizenship by purchase being restricted only to persons aged 50 or older in 1938.

Switzerland and Germany were highly critical of this citizenship pathway, particularly for its lack of requirement for residence. Although a period of three years of residence became technically required under the 1934 revision of nationality law, this was never enforced. Switzerland continued to voice concern over this method of naturalisation and later requested that their government be granted the authority to approve new grants of Liechtenstein citizenship. Liechtenstein conceded this in 1941 under an immigration agreement signed with the Swiss that also established  free movement of persons between the two countries. On the other hand, Switzerland maintained a right under this agreement to process a naturalisation for a foreigner resident in Switzerland as a Liechtenstein citizen; the Swiss government could circumvent its own stringent nationality law so that it could effectively naturalise high value tax residents.

In the 1955 Nottebohm case, the International Court of Justice ruled that Guatemala had no obligation to grant diplomatic protection to a Liechtenstein national who had obtained that nationality without a period of residence in the country. Following this ruling, Liechtenstein ceased further grants of citizenship by purchase and fully removed the legal provisions for this pathway in 1960.

European integration 

Liechtenstein joined the European Free Trade Association in 1991, following 31 years of informal membership through its customs union with Switzerland. The formation of the European Union in 1992 and consequent creation of EU citizenship allowed nationals of all EU countries to live and work in any other member state. The scope of these free movement rights was expanded with the establishment of the European Economic Area (EEA) in 1994 to include nationals of all EEA member states, which included the entire EFTA except for Liechtenstein and Switzerland. Following the 1992 Swiss referendum rejecting EEA membership, Liechtenstein renegotiated its customs union with Switzerland to allow for sole participation in the EEA, which it acceded to in 1995. Switzerland concluded a separate free movement agreement with the EU that came into force in 2002.

Acquisition and loss of nationality

Entitlement by descent or adoption 
Any person born to at least one parent who is a Liechtensteiner citizen automatically receives Liechtensteiner citizenship at birth. Individuals born to unmarried mothers who are Liechtensteiner citizens also receive citizenship automatically at birth, while those born to unmarried fathers have a right to claim citizenship retroactive to their date of birth. Abandoned children found in the country are presumed to have been born as Liechtensteiner citizens, and adopted children acquire citizenship at the time of adoption.

Voluntary acquisition 
Non-citizens who are married to Liechtensteiner citizens may become citizens by facilitated naturalisation after living in the country for at least 10 years. The time of residence after marriage counts as double towards this requirement, making five years the minimum period of domicile. Individuals resident in the country for at least 30 years also hold a right to facilitated naturalisation, with time spent in the country before the age of 20 counting as double. Stateless individuals born in Liechtenstein and who have been resident for least five years are eligible as well. Foreigners who become citizens by marriage also acquire the municipal citizenship of their spouses, while those who were eligible under the residence requirement or by virtue of statelessness become citizens of the municipality where they were last resident.

Foreigners not eligible for facilitated naturalisation become qualified to apply through the standard procedure after 10 years of residence. Applicants must petition a local municipality to grant them local citizenship rights through a public ballot. Candidates who actively participate in community life are more likely to be accepted, though this is not guaranteed. Local residents are unlikely to vote in favour of granting citizenship to anyone not resident for at least 30 years. In 2012, 119 people were naturalised but only one person acquired citizenship by popular vote. All applicants of both facilitated and standard naturalisation processes are required to demonstrate sufficient knowledge of the German language (at least at the B1 level in the Common European Framework of Reference for Languages) and renounce all previous nationalities.

Relinquishment and deprivation 
Liechtensteiner citizenship can be relinquished by making a declaration of renunciation, provided that the declarant already possesses or intends to acquire another nationality. Minor children of a person who gave up citizenship also cease to be citizens. Naturalised citizens may be stripped of their citizenship within five years of having acquired it if they have been found to not have actually met the naturalisation requirements. Citizenship may be deprived at any time from a person who fraudulently acquired it.

References

Citations

Sources 

 
 
 
 
 
 
 
 
 
 
 

Nationality law
Nationality